Cardanus is a lunar impact crater that is located in the western part of the Moon, in the western part of the Oceanus Procellarum. Due to its location the crater appears very oval because of foreshortening, and it is viewed almost from the side.

Cardanus is distinctive for the chain of craters, designated Catena Krafft, that connect its northern rim with the crater Krafft to the north. The outer rim is sharp-edged and somewhat irregular, with a hummocky outer rampart and terraces along parts of the inner wall. The crater floor has several small craterlets across its surface, and it has a low ridge near the midpoint. The floor surface is somewhat irregular in the southwest, but nearly featureless elsewhere.

To the southwest is the rille designated Rima Cardanus, a cleft in the mare that generally follows a northeasterly direction. To the southeast, beyond the rille, is the small crater Galilaei. Southwest of Cardanus is Olbers.

Satellite craters
By convention these features are identified on lunar maps by placing the letter on the side of the crater midpoint that is closest to Cardanus.

References

 
 
 
 
 
 
 
 
 
 
 
 

Impact craters on the Moon